Gymnostomum viridulum is a species of moss belonging to the family Pottiaceae.

It has almost cosmopolitan distribution.

References

Pottiaceae